The Austreberthe is an 18-km river in the Seine-Maritime. Its source is the village of Sainte-Austreberthe.  It meets the Seine at Duclair.

The Austreberthe is crossed by the Barentin Viaduct, a noteworthy 30 metre high brick railway bridge built in 1846, about 19-km from Rouen.

References

External links
 Au fil de l'Austreberthe...

Rivers of France
Rivers of Normandy
Rivers of Seine-Maritime